Hans Gustaf Liljedahl (7 April 1913 – 9 November 1991) was a Swedish sport shooter. He competed in trap shooting at the 1952 and 1956 Olympics and finished third and eighth, respectively. He won three world titles in this event, in 1947 and 1952.

Personal life
Liljedahl was born in Stockholm on 7 April 1913.

He died in Lidingö on 9 November 1991.

References

1913 births
1991 deaths
Sport shooters from Stockholm
Swedish male sport shooters
Shooters at the 1952 Summer Olympics
Shooters at the 1956 Summer Olympics
Olympic shooters of Sweden
Olympic bronze medalists for Sweden
Olympic medalists in shooting
Medalists at the 1952 Summer Olympics
20th-century Swedish people